Kareh-ye Qaleh Sefid (also Romanized as Kareh-ye Qal‘eh Sefīd and Kareh Qal‘eh Safīd; also known as Kaleh Kareh, Karah-e Qal‘eh, Kareh Qal‘eh, Qal‘eh Sefīd, and Qal‘eh-ye Sefīd Kareh) is a village in Dowlatabad Rural District, in the Central District of Ravansar County, Kermanshah Province, Iran. At the 2006 census, its population was 142, in 25 families.

References 

Populated places in Ravansar County